Pau López Sabata (born 13 December 1994) is a Spanish professional footballer who plays as a goalkeeper for Ligue 1 club Marseille.

He has played for Espanyol, Tottenham Hotspur, Betis, Roma and Marseille.

López reached the final of the 2017 European Under-21 Championship with Spain. He made his full debut the following year.

Club career

Espanyol
López was born in Girona, Catalonia. He joined Espanyol's youth setup in 2007 at the age of 12, after starting out at hometown club Girona. He made his senior debut with the former's B team in the 2013–14 season, in Segunda División B.

On 12 June 2014, López signed a new four-year contract with Espanyol, also being promoted to the main squad. He played his first match as a professional on 17 December, starting in a 1–0 home win against Alavés in the round of 32 of the Copa del Rey and being first choice in the tournament as his team reached the semi-finals for the first time in nine years.

López's debut in La Liga occurred on 1 February 2015, after starter Kiko Casilla was sent off in the 40th minute of the fixture at Sevilla for handling Iago Aspas' shot outside of the penalty area, and he conceded once in an eventual 3–2 defeat. After the latter's departure to Real Madrid in the summer, he became the starter.

On 6 January 2016, during an away fixture against Barcelona in the Copa del Rey, López repeatedly stamped on Lionel Messi after the two players became entangled, in an action that eluded the referee but was caught on camera. On 31 August, he joined Premier League club Tottenham Hotspur on loan for the 2016–17 season, being third choice behind Hugo Lloris and Michel Vorm, he failed to make a single competitive appearance.

After his return to the RCDE Stadium, López continued to start under new manager Quique Sánchez Flores.

Betis
On 4 July 2018, López signed a five-year deal with fellow top-tier club Betis on a free transfer. Under Quique Setién, he missed just five league matches in his only season as the team finished in 10th place.

Roma
López joined Serie A club Roma on 9 July 2019 on a five-year contract, for a reported fee of €23.5 million. He made his debut on 25 August in a 3–3 home draw with Genoa, making a further 31 appearances by the end of the campaign for the fifth-placed team. On 26 January 2020, he made a mistake in the Derby della Capitale to gift a goal to Lazio's Francesco Acerbi in a 1–1 draw.

In 2020–21, López started as back-up to Antonio Mirante, before returning to the team after the veteran's injury. His season was ended prematurely by a shoulder injury against Manchester United in the semi-final of the UEFA Europa League.

Marseille
On 8 July 2021, López was loaned to Ligue 1 club Marseille for the upcoming season, with an option to buy in the summer of 2022. Facing competition from experienced Steve Mandanda, he made his debut on 11 September in a 2–0 win away to Monaco, and retained his place over the France international throughout the campaign. 

Marseille exercised their option to purchase López on 8 January 2022, effective as of 1 July.

International career

López made his international debut on 26 December 2015, having a player of the match performance for Catalonia in a 1–0 friendly loss to the Basque Country. On 28 March 2016, he played his first game with the Spain under-21 team, in a 1–0 win against Norway at the Estadio Nueva Condomina.

On 17 May 2016, López and Espanyol teammate Marco Asensio were called up to the senior team for a friendly against Bosnia and Herzegovina. He only won his first cap more than two years later, after coming on as a 75th-minute substitute for Kepa Arrizabalaga in a 1–0 win over the same opposition in Las Palmas.

Career statistics

Club

International

Honours
Spain U21
UEFA European Under-21 Championship runner-up: 2017

Individual
UEFA Europa League Squad of the Season: 2020–21

References

External links

Espanyol official profile  

1994 births
Living people
Sportspeople from Girona
Spanish footballers
Footballers from Catalonia
Association football goalkeepers
La Liga players
Segunda División B players
RCD Espanyol B footballers
RCD Espanyol footballers
Real Betis players
Tottenham Hotspur F.C. players
Serie A players
A.S. Roma players
Ligue 1 players
Olympique de Marseille players
Spain under-21 international footballers
Spain international footballers
Catalonia international footballers
Spanish expatriate footballers
Expatriate footballers in England
Expatriate footballers in Italy
Expatriate footballers in France
Spanish expatriate sportspeople in England
Spanish expatriate sportspeople in Italy
Spanish expatriate sportspeople in France